The 2021 Arkansas–Pine Bluff Golden Lions football team represented the University of Arkansas at Pine Bluff in the 2021 NCAA Division I FCS football season. The Golden Lions played their home games at Simmons Bank Field in Pine Bluff, Arkansas, and competed in the West Division of the Southwestern Athletic Conference (SWAC). They were led by second-year head coach Doc Gamble.

Schedule

Game summaries

Lane

at No. 25 Central Arkansas

Alcorn State

at Prairie View A&M

at Alabama State

Southern

at Arkansas

at Texas Southern

Grambling State

Florida A&M

at Alabama A&M

References

Arkansas-Pine Bluff
Arkansas–Pine Bluff Golden Lions football seasons
Arkansas-Pine Bluff Golden Lions football